Gardenia is a village in Belize District, Belize located about  north of Belize City.

Geography 
Gardenia is located at  (17.673, -88.418), between Sandhill and Biscayne villages.

Gardenia stretches from mile 20 to 23 on the Northern Highway and includes the Grace Bank Community for administrative purposes. The village of May Pen, one of the Belize River Valley Communities, is accessed by land via a detour from Gardenia. In terms of waterways, the Belize River passes through Grace Bank, while the Mexico Creek/Lagoon flows through huge culverts across the Northern Highway and empties into the river at Grace Bank. The village is 13.92 meters or 45.669 feet above sea level. 

thumb

History of Gardenia 
In 1985, a group of senior women decided to form a Women's group. After approaching the Ministry of Rural Development with their idea, Mrs. Ann Olivera and her Associates decided on the name “Gardenia” for the village. 

With the current population of 350, residents primarily focus on farming.  They commute to other urban centers for employment and education, taking elementary education in the nearby Sandhill and Biscayne villages.

Crooked Tree Wildlife Sanctuary
Gardenia is part of the Crooked Tree Wildlife Sanctuary for birds and other endangered species.

References 

Belize District Milages. Government of Belize. Retrieved on 2008-04-19.

Populated places in Belize District
Belize Rural North